Heresy Records is an independent classical record label based in Dublin.

History
Heresy Records was founded by American opera director Eric Fraad. The label specializes in Early music, Traditional Irish music, World music, Contemporary music and a synthesis of these genres. Heresy Records is known for its unconventional approach to cover art design. It is distributed worldwide by Naxos.

Heresy’s recording of The Wexford Carols, produced by Joe Henry and featuring singers, Caitríona O’Leary, Tom Jones, Rosanne Cash and Rhiannon Giddens reached #1 on the Billboard World Music Chart in 2015.

Heresy’s New York-based imprint, Isotopia Records focuses on diverse styles of popular music.

Repertoire
Composers featured on Heresy Records albums include John Dowland, William Lawes, Henry Lawes, John Ward, Antonio de Salazar, Gaspar Fernandes, Sebastián Durón, Hildegard of Bingen, Guillaume Dufay, Santiago de Murcia, John Cage, Morton Feldman, Roger Doyle, Ian Wilson, Scott Wollschleger, Linda Buckley, Donnacha Dennehy, Enda Bates, and Daniel Figgis.

Select Discography

 Shipwrecked (2012) - eX Early Music Ensemble
 Ecstasy (2012) - Caitríona O'Leary and Dúlra
 Motion of the Heart (2012) - The Dublin Drag Orchestra
 Possessed (2013) - eX Early Music Ensemble
 On the Nature of Electricity and Acoustics - various (2013)
 Sleepsongs (2014) - Caitríona O'Leary and Dúlra
 The Transcendentalist (2014) - Ivan Ilić
 The Wexford Carols (2014) -Caitríona O'Leary, Tom Jones (singer), Rosanne Cash, Rhiannon Giddens, and Joe Henry.
Time Machine (2015) - Roger Doyle
A Map of the Kingdom of Ireland (2018) - Various Artists compiled by Eric Fraad
Heresy (2018) - Roger Doyle

See also
 ECM Records
 Naïve Records
 Nonesuch Records

References

External links
 Heresy Records web site
 Interview with founder Eric Fraad on Modulations.

Classical music record labels
Irish record labels
Record labels established in 2012
World music record labels
Electronic music record labels
Folk record labels